

Shafi Hadi (born Curtis Porter, 21 September 1929 – 1976) was an American jazz tenor and alto saxophonist known for his recordings with Charles Mingus and with Hank Mobley.

Biography 
Hadi was born Curtis Porter in Philadelphia, Pennsylvania. The 1930 Census indicated his parents were William Porter and Harriette Porter.  At age 6, he received piano lessons from his grandmother.  Later, he studied musical composition at Howard University and University of Detroit.  Hadi performed with rhythm and blues artists such as Paul Williams, Ruth Brown, and the Griffin Brothers.

Hadi recorded with bassist Charles Mingus between 1956 and 1958. He also recorded with tenor saxophonist Hank Mobley. Hadi improvised the soundtrack music for John Cassavetes's film Shadows, then returned to Mingus's group in 1959.  He also collaborated with Mary Lou Williams on her 1977 composition "Shafi", although the extent of Hadi's contribution is unclear.  The 1977 Copyright filing EU841296 by Mary Lou Williams credited words to Hadi, pseud. of Shafi Porter, with music and arrangement credited to Mary Lou Williams.

During the 1950s, Hadi was also active in painting.  Between 1965 and 1969 he co-wrote five songs with Lionel Hampton or Gladys Hampton: Bye, Bye, Hamp Stamps, No, Say No, A Sketch Of Gladys, and Mama Knows.

Ancestrylibrary.com has the May 1943 Social Security Application for William Curtis Porter, born 21 September 1929 in Philadelphia, Pennsylvania, and a Death Date on June 1976.  The Social Security Death Index for William Porter indicates that his Social Security Number was issued before 1951 in West Virginia, and confirms a Death Date of June 1976. Neither the exact date of death nor a location are specified.

Playing style 
Brian Priestley describes Hadi's performance style as a "distinctive mixture of bop and blues, combined with a very individual tone."  Martin Williams, writing in 1958, described Hadi's playing as being "both contemporary and a reflection of an apprenticeship in rhythm and blues bands."

Discography

As leader
 Debut Rarities, Vol. 3 (1957, Original Jazz Classics) – Shafi Hadi Sextet

As sideman
With Langston Hughes
Weary Blues (MGM, 1958)
With Charles Mingus
 The Clown (1957 ; Atlantic Records)
 Tijuana Moods (1957; (issued 1962) RCA Records)
 East Coasting (1957; Bethlehem Records)
 A Modern Jazz Symposium of Music and Poetry (1957; Bethlehem)
 Mingus Ah Um (1959; Columbia Records)
 Tonight at Noon (1961; Atlantic)

With Hank Mobley:
 Hank Mobley (1957; Blue Note Records)

References 

1929 births
1976 deaths
Living people
Musicians from Philadelphia
American jazz alto saxophonists
American jazz tenor saxophonists
American male saxophonists
Bebop saxophonists
21st-century American saxophonists
Jazz musicians from Pennsylvania
21st-century American male musicians
American male jazz musicians